In statistics, hierarchical generalized linear models extend generalized linear models by relaxing the assumption that error components are independent. This allows models to be built in situations where more than one error term is necessary and also allows for dependencies between error terms. The error components can be correlated and not necessarily follow a normal distribution. When there are different clusters, that is, groups of observations, the observations in the same cluster are correlated. In fact, they are positively correlated because observations in the same cluster share some common features. In this situation, using generalized linear models and ignoring the correlations may cause problems.

Overview and model

Model
In a hierarchical model, observations are grouped into clusters, and the distribution of an observation is determined not only by common structure among all clusters but also by the specific structure of the cluster where this observation belongs. So a random effect component, different for different clusters, is introduced into the model.

The linear predictor is in the form:

 

The random component  is unobserved and varies among clusters randomly. So  takes the same value for observations in the same cluster and different values for observations in different clusters.

Identifiability
Identifiability is a concept in statistics. In order to perform parameter inference, it is necessary to make sure that the identifiability property holds. In the model stated above, the location of v is not identifiable, since

 

for constant . In order to make the model identifiable, we need to impose constraints on parameters.

Models with different distributions and link functions

Moreover, the generalized linear mixed model (GLMM) is a special case of the hierarchical generalized linear model. In hierarchical generalized linear models, the distributions of random effect  do not necessarily follow normal distribution.

If  follows binomial distribution with certain mean,  has the conjugate beta distribution, and canonical logit link is used, then we call the model Beta conjugate model. Moreover, the mixed linear model is the normal conjugate hierarchical generalized linear models.

A summary of commonly used models are:

Fitting the hierarchical generalized linear models
Hierarchical generalized linear models are used when observations come from different clusters. There are two types of estimators: fixed effect estimators and random effect estimators, corresponding to parameters in :  
There are different ways to obtain parameter estimates for a hierarchical generalized linear model. If only fixed effect estimators are of interests, the population-averaged model can be used. If inference is focused on individuals, random effects will have to be predicted. There are different techniques to fit a hierarchical generalized linear model.

Examples and applications
Hierarchical generalized linear model have been used to solve different real-life problems.

Engineering
For example, this method was used to analyze semiconductor manufacturing, because interrelated processes form a complex hierarchy. Semiconductor fabrication is a complex process which requires different interrelated processes. Hierarchical generalized linear model, requiring clustered data, is able to deal with complicated process. Engineers can use this model to find out and analyze important subprocesses, and at the same time, evaluate the influences of these subprocesses on final performance.

Business
Market research problems can also be analyzed by using hierarchical generalized linear models. Researchers applied the model to consumers within countries in order to solve problems in nested data structure in international marketing research.

References

Regression models
Generalized linear models